

Biblical References
Shiloh is mentioned by Jacob the father of the 12 tribes of Israel in Genesis 49:10 within the context of the return of the messiah. The meaning "He Who It Is" which is a Messianic title representing Jesus Christ.

Name Popularity
The name was the 803rd most popular name for girls born in the United States in 2007, 650th in 2008, 604th by 2009, and 620th by 2010. The name was popularized when American actors Angelina Jolie and Brad Pitt named their daughter Shiloh Nouvel (born 2006). The name had previously been used occasionally for boys and girls, though it was never previously among the top 1,000 names for any gender in the United States.

In the United States, the name has associations with the Southern United States due to the Battle of Shiloh, a major battle of the United States Civil War, and to many towns named Shiloh in southern states, which were usually named after the town in the Bible.

People named Shiloh include:

 Shiloh Fernandez (born 1985), American actor
 Shiloh Keo (born 1987), American football player
 Shlomit Malka (born 1993), Israeli fashion model sometimes called Shiloh Malka
 Shiloh Strong (born 1978), American actor, screenwriter, photographer and film director
 Shiloh Walker, American author of erotic romance novels and novellas
 Shiloh Wallace, Fictional character from the American rock horror opera film, Repo! The Genetic Opera

Notes

English given names
Hebrew Bible places
Hebrew unisex given names